Massimo Moriconi (born May 20, 1955, in Rome) is an Italian bassist.

See also
 Glossary of Italian music
 Music history of Italy
 Music of Italy

References

External links
http://www.globalbass.com/archives/feb2002/massimo_moriconi.htm

Italian double-bassists
Male double-bassists
Musicians from Rome
21st-century double-bassists
21st-century Italian male musicians
1955 births
Living people